Soren Sturm (born December 15, 1989) is a German professional ice hockey defenceman. He is currently an unrestricted free agent who most recently played for Straubing Tigers in the Deutsche Eishockey Liga (DEL). Sturm previously played with EHC München. On April 19, 2013, Sturm left Red Bull München off contract and signed a two-year deal with fellow DEL competitors, the Straubing Tigers.

References

External links

1989 births
Kölner Haie players
Living people
EHC München players
German ice hockey defencemen
Straubing Tigers players
Sportspeople from Cologne